El Presidente is Spanish for "The President".

Entertainment
 El Presidente (band), a Scottish glam rock band
El Presidente (album), a 2005 album by the band
 El Presidente: General Emilio Aguinaldo Story and the First Philippine Republic, a 2012 Filipino film
 El Presidente (TV series), a 2020 Chilean TV series
 "El Presidente", a 2004 song by the Modena City Ramblers
 "El Presidente", a song by Herb Alpert's Tijuana Brass from the 1964 album South of the Border

People
 Ramon Fernandez (born 1953), a four-time MVP of the Philippine Basketball Association who was nicknamed El Presidente
 Dennis Martínez (born 1955), a Major League Baseball player who was nicknamed El Presidente
 Mahmoud Al-Zein (born 1966), Lebanese crime lord and current head of the Al-Zein Clan; he is nicknamed El Presidente
 El Presidente (musician) (born 1973), Italian rapper
 David Portnoy (born 1977), nicknamed El Presidente, founder and editor of the blog Barstool Sports

Other
 El Presidente (cocktail), a type of drink made with vermouth
 El Presidente, a combat pistol shooting drill
 El Presidente, the title given to the player's character in Tropico
 El Presidente, common name for a Presidente cigar

See also
 El Presidente of Mandaue, the mayor of Mandaue, Philippines, during the American commonwealth era (1899–1943)
 El Señor Presidente, a 1946 Spanish novel by Miguel Ángel Asturias
 "El President", a song by the band Drugstore
 "Meet El Presidente", a song from the 1987 Duran Duran album Notorious